Enrique Luis Sapene (born August 4, 1983) is a Venezuelan born actor and producer based in Los Angeles.

Personal
Enrique Sapene was born in Caracas, Venezuela. He comes from a family with a long lineage in Television which includes Marcel Granier and Eduardo Sapene from Venezuela's RCTV. Enrique Sapene grew up between Venezuela, France and the United States where he now resides.

While in the United States, Enrique attended the Lee Strasberg Theatre and Film Institute for method acting.

Career
On March 16, 2016 WEtv announced the cast of "My Life is a Telenovela" with Enrique as a principal actor along with fellow telenovela stars Sissi Fleitas, Liliana Rodriguez, Maria Raquenel Portillo and Gustavo Pedraza. The show highlighted the lives of telenovela stars, the challenges of casting and the drama usually associated with the famed telenovelas.

In 2008, Enrique participated in a reality show named Viva Hollywood on the VH1 Network hosted by Carlos Ponce and María Conchita Alonso.

References

 Biography of Enrique Sapene
 

1983 births
Living people
People from Caracas
Venezuelan emigrants to the United States
Venezuelan male actors
Participants in American reality television series